is a Paralympian athlete from Japan competing mainly in category F53 discus events.

Toshie has competed at two Paralympics, firstly in Athens in 2004 where he won the silver medal in the F53 discus and secondly in Beijing in 2008 where he won the bronze medal in the combined  F53/54 class discus.

External links
 

Paralympic athletes of Japan
Athletes (track and field) at the 2004 Summer Paralympics
Athletes (track and field) at the 2008 Summer Paralympics
Paralympic silver medalists for Japan
Paralympic bronze medalists for Japan
Living people
World record holders in Paralympic athletics
Medalists at the 2004 Summer Paralympics
Medalists at the 2008 Summer Paralympics
Year of birth missing (living people)
Paralympic medalists in athletics (track and field)
Japanese male discus throwers
21st-century Japanese people